Anthony Tyler Payne (born October 25, 1992) is an American professional baseball catcher who is a free agent. He made his MLB debut in 2021 for the Chicago Cubs.

Career
Payne graduated from Hurricane High School in Hurricane, West Virginia, and attended West Virginia State University, where he played college baseball for the West Virginia State Yellow Jackets. The Cubs selected Payne in the 30th round, with the 893rd overall selection, of the 2015 MLB draft.

Payne did not play in a game in 2020 due to the cancellation of the minor league season because of the COVID-19 pandemic. Payne spent the majority of the 2021 season with the Double-A Tennessee Smokies, also appearing in 1 game for the Triple-A Iowa Cubs, hitting a cumulative .231/.291/.363 with 4 home runs and 30 RBI in 60 games. The Cubs promoted Payne to the major leagues for the first time on October 3, 2021. He made his major league debut that day as a pinch hitter. He was designated for assignment by the team on October 18, 2021. On November 16, Payne re-signed with the Cubs on a minor league contract. He elected free agency on November 10, 2022.

References

External links

West Virginia State Yellow Jackets bio

1997 births
Living people
People from Hurricane, West Virginia
Baseball players from West Virginia
Major League Baseball catchers
Chicago Cubs players
West Virginia State Yellow Jackets baseball players
Arizona League Cubs players
Eugene Emeralds players
South Bend Cubs players
Myrtle Beach Pelicans players
Tennessee Smokies players
Iowa Cubs players